Patrick Eugene Joseph Prendergast (6 April 1868 – 13 July 1894) was an Irish-born American newspaper distributor who assassinated Chicago Mayor Carter Harrison, Sr., fatally shooting the five-term mayor on October 28, 1893. Following two separate trials, in which the defense tried unsuccessfully to have him acquitted by reason of insanity, Prendergast was ultimately found guilty and sentenced to death for the assassination. He was executed by hanging on July 13, 1894, the only client of famed attorney Clarence Darrow to ever receive the death penalty.

Biography

Early life
Prendergast was born on 6 April 1868 in Cloonamore townland, Inishbofin, an island off the west coast of Ireland. He was baptised in St Colman's Church on 12 April 1868  His parents were Ellen King (1837–1914) and Patrick Prendergast (1840–1886), both of whom were described as teachers at their marriage in Inishbofin on 2 July 1865. His grandfather, William Prendergast, who lost an arm in Pamplona, was an army pensioner who was reported to have died insane. His mother had "repeated attacks of hysterics" and his father died of consumption. 

Prendergast was reported to have suffered a severe head injury from a fall at the age of four, from which he was unconscious for a long period of time and suffered vomiting for four weeks after. He was described as a peculiar child, solitary, irritable and excitable, with a poor memory who did poorly in school. Patrick arrived in New York on 20 May 1873, aged 5, traveling with his brother William, aged 8, on the SS France. He left home at 16 because of imaginary persecution and by 18 had developed grandiose ideas of his capabilities and became a fanatic for the single-tax promoted by Henry George.

Prendergast became a newspaper distributor in Chicago, where he lobbied for improvements in Chicago's railroad grade crossings, which he saw as a danger to the public. In 1893, he supported Carter Harrison's re-election campaign under the delusion that if Harrison won the election, Prendergast would receive an appointment as Corporation Counsel. Harrison was elected mayor in April 1893, to a non-consecutive fifth term. Before and after the election, Prendergast wrote numerous letters to and visited the offices of prominent politicians associated with Harrison's campaign.

Assassination of Mayor Harrison

When the appointment did not come, Prendergast visited Harrison at his home on October 28, 1893, ringing the doorbell at 7:50 p.m. Prendergrast was admitted by a maid who went to wake the mayor, who was taking a nap on a sofa in the parlor. As Harrison stepped into the hallway from the parlor, Prendergast approached and shot the mayor three times with a .38 revolver, hitting him first in the abdomen above the navel, a second time under the left arm with a shot that pierced his heart, and a third time at point-blank range through the left hand.

Harrison's coachman, hearing the gunfire, ran towards the site of the shooting with a pistol of his own, firing three times at the escaping Prendergast without hitting him, while avoiding being hit when Prendergast returned fire. Mortally wounded, Harrison died in his home at 8:25 p.m.

The escaping assassin was chased down Ashland Avenue by several citizens and a police officer, who ran after him to the Des Plaines Street police station, where Prendergast immediately surrendered. He still had the gun in his possession. When interviewed by police, he gave varying stories as to his motive, including the failed appointment and the mayor's failure to elevate train track crossings. The smell of burned powder and the revolver's empty chambers reaffirmed to the police department that Prendergast was telling the truth.

Prendergast was taken from the Des Plaines Street station to the Central Station, located downtown, where the building was quickly surrounded by a crowd of 5,000 people. Fearing potential mob violence, at 11:15 p.m., Prendergast was stealthily hurried into a wagon and taken to another station located on the North Side of the city, where he was lodged in the county jail pending trial.

Trials
In his first trial, Prendergast's attorney tried to have him declared insane. Chicago lawyers disagreed, as Prendergast had taken special care to keep an empty chamber in his revolver as he carried it around. This demonstrated rationality because carrying a revolver of that era with a live round under the hammer could cause it to go off if dropped; having the forethought to leave the chamber safely empty demonstrated sanity. Modern revolvers have safety features to prevent such accidental discharges. Several doctors testified that while Prendergast was paranoid, he knew right from wrong and was capable of standing trial for the murder. Clarence Darrow later won a hearing on Prendergast's sanity, but the defense also failed in the second trial and Prendergast was found guilty. He was sentenced to death.

Execution

At 10 a.m. on the morning of July 13, 1894, Cook County Sheriff James H. Gilbert visited Prendergast's cell and read him the death warrant issued in his case. He was visited one last time by his brother John at 11 a.m., by which time hope for a last-minute reprieve from Governor John Altgeld had dissipated. He was visited by a doctor at 11:30 and spent a brief time with a priest, declaring that there had been no malice in the killing of Mayor Harrison. Five minutes before his scheduled 11:45 execution, Prendergast's attorney, S.S. Gregory, arrived and was allowed to shake his client's hand one last time and to exchange a few words.

A gallows had been constructed in the north corridor of the jail and seats placed between the row of cells along the north side and the high building wall. Prisoners facing the corridor were removed from their cells to a place where the execution would not be visible, and about 500 ticketed witnesses were assembled, which included the members of the jury which convicted him. At 11:43 the order was given to march and Prendergast was led to the gallows, accompanied by Father Gilbert of the Cathedral of the Holy Name, who was on hand to administer the last rites of the Catholic Church.

Prendergast walked to the edge of the trap without assistance, where his hands were fastened. Although having previously planned to make a last statement, he had been dissuaded by the priest, to whom he quietly delivered his last words, "I had no malice against anyone." Prendergast's feet, knees, and chest were bound with straps and a white shroud placed over him and he was taken onto the trap, where the noose was placed around his neck. A white muslin hood was placed over his head and the noose, obscuring both from view.

A signal was given and at 11:48 the rope holding the heavy trap in place was cut. Prendergast's neck was broken by the six-foot drop and his body did not move after the fall. Prendergast's heart continued to beat for about ten minutes, after which it ceased; five minutes later his body was taken down and placed in an awaiting coffin for burial.

Media depictions 
On occasion, Prendergast has been represented in film or fiction. In the 1991 made-for-TV movie Darrow, he was portrayed by New York-born actor Paul Klementowicz. Prendergast's story is one of the subplots in Erik Larson's 2003 best-selling non-fiction book The Devil in the White City.

See also 
 The Devil in the White City
 Charles Guiteau, assassin of President James Garfield with similar motives

Footnotes

Bibliography 
 Larson, Erik, The Devil in the White City, Crown Publishers, New York, 2003.

1868 births
1894 deaths
1893 murders in the United States
American people convicted of murder
People executed for murder
Criminals from Chicago
Illinois Democrats
People from County Galway
Executed Irish people
19th-century Irish people
19th-century executions by the United States
American assassins
People executed by Illinois by hanging
19th-century executions of American people
People convicted of murder by Illinois
Irish emigrants to the United States (before 1923)
Irish people executed abroad